Abdullah Al-Dossari (born 1 February 1983) is a Saudi Arabian footballer who plays as a midfielder.

References

External links
 

1983 births
Living people
Saudi Arabian footballers
Saudi Arabia international footballers
Saudi Arabia youth international footballers
Association football midfielders
Al-Shabab FC (Riyadh) players
Al-Wehda Club (Mecca) players
Al-Hazem F.C. players
Al-Fateh SC players
Ettifaq FC players
Al-Mujazzal Club players
Saudi Professional League players
Saudi First Division League players